Uphill Battle was an American metalcore band with elements of grindcore, based out of Santa Barbara, California, United States.

History
Uphill Battle got some recognition releasing their self-titled record on Relapse Records. Combining grindcores speed with a hardcore sense of tension, Uphill Battle’s hectic riffing, strafing percussive assault and tortured vocals bled conviction and proved the band to be one of the scene’s brightest hopefuls. A tour slot as part of the 2003 Relapse Records Contamination Tour alongside label-mates Mastodon, Cephalic Carnage and Dysrhythmia immediately followed, exposing the band to entirely new audiences.

Uphill Battle released their second full-length, Wreck of Nerves in 2004. In 2005, Uphill Battle disbanded, leaving behind Blurred, a collection of their pre-Relapse rarities including demo and compilation tracks.

Members
Adi Tejada - Guitars, lead vocals
Danny Walker - Drums
Jeff Capra - Guitars
Casey Shropshire - Bass and vocals

Discography

Albums
Uphill Battle - (2002)
Wreck of Nerves - (2004)

Compilation albums
Blurred - (2006)

Related bands
Intronaut - Drummer Danny Walker's band
Sutratma - Singer/Guitarist Adi Tejada's band

References

External links
 Official Uphill Battle Web site
 Relapse Records

Musical groups established in 1999
Musical groups disestablished in 2005
Heavy metal musical groups from California
Metalcore musical groups from California
Relapse Records artists
1999 establishments in California